Luciano Canepari (born 19 January 1947) is an Italian linguist. Canepari is a professor in the Department of Linguistics at the University of Venice, where he received his academic training.

He developed a phonetic transcription system called canIPA , based on the official IPA. The canIPA consists of 500 basic, 300 complementary and 200 supplementary symbols. It is a work in progress, intended to permit the transcription of all world languages in more exact detail than the official IPA. It has seen little use apart from its inventor or his co-authors.

Bibliography
ɪtæljən prənʌnsɪeɪʃən. in: Le Maître Phonétique, 133: 6–8, 1970 
The Dialect of Venice. in: Journal of the International Phonetic Association, 67–76, 1976
Introduzione alla fonetica. Torino: Einaudi, 1979
Fonetica e tonetica araba. in: Scritti linguistici in onore di Giovan Battista Pellegrini, 1105–1121. Pisa: Pacini, 1983.
Phonetic Notation/La notazione fonetica. Venice: Cafoscarina, 1983 (in English and Italian; with two audio-cassettes)
L’intonazione. Linguistica e paralinguistica. Napoli: Liguori, 1985
Italiano standard e pronunce regionali. Padova: CLEUP, 1986³ (with two audio-cassettes)
Lingua italiana nel Lazio. Roma: Jouvence, 1989 (co-authored by Antonella Troncon)
Dizionario di pronuncia italiana. Bologna: Zanichelli, 1999; new ed. 2000 — There is an on-line version (copyright 2012) at dipionline.it.
Manuale di pronuncia italiana. Bologna: Zanichelli, 1999; new ed. 2004
Manuale di fonetica. Fonetica naturale. München: Lincom Europa, 2003
translated as: A Handbook of Phonetics: Natural Phonetics. München: Lincom Europa, 2005
Manuale di pronuncia. Italiano, inglese, francese, tedesco, spagnolo, portoghese, russo, arabo, hindi, cinese, giapponese, esperanto. München: Lincom Europa, 2003; new ed. 2007
translated as: A Handbook of Pronunciation: English, Italian, French, German, Spanish, Portuguese, Russian, Arabic, Hindi, Chinese, Japanese, Esperanto. München: Lincom Europa, 2005; new ed. 2007
Avviamento alla fonetica. Torino: Einaudi, 2006
Fonetica e tonetica naturali. München: Lincom Europa, 2007
translated as: Natural Phonetics and Tonetics. München: Lincom Europa, 2007 — This is the revised edition of A Handbook of Phonetics: Natural Phonetics from 2005.
Pronunce straniere dell'italiano. 2007
Pronuncia cinese per italiani. Roma: Aracne, 2009 (co-authored by Marco Cerini)
English pronunciationS. [Vol.1: International, American & British neutral accents. Vol. 2: Territorial accents] Roma: Aracne, 2010
La buona pronuncia italiana del terzo millennio. Roma: Aracne, 2010³ (co-authored by Barbara Giovannelli; with a CD-ROM)
The Pronunciation of English around the World. München: Lincom Europa, 2010
Pronuncia francese per italiani. Roma: Aracne, 2011³
Pronuncia inglese per italiani. Roma: Aracne, 2011³
Pronuncia portoghese per italiani. Roma: Aracne, 2011²
Pronuncia spagnola per italiani. Roma: Aracne, 2011 (co-authored by Renzo Miotti)
Pronuncia tedesca per italiani. Roma: Aracne, 2011
Fonologia del santarcangiolese. Verucchio: Pazzini 2012 (co-authored by Giuseppe Bellosi and Daniele Vitali)
Dutch & Afrikaans Pronunciation & Accents. München: Lincom Europa, 2013; 2nd ed. 2016; and a cheaper edition: Roma: Aracne, 2013 (co-authored by Marco Cerini)
Pronuncia neerlandese per italiani. Roma: Aracne, 2013 (co-authored by Marco Cerini)
Pronuncia russa per italiani. Roma: Aracne, 2013 (co-authored by Daniele Vitali)
German Pronunciation & Accents. München: Lincom Europa, 2014
Chinese Pronunciation & Accents. München: Lincom Europa, 2015 (co-authored by Marco Cerini)
English Pronunciation & Accents. München: Lincom Europa, 2015
Hindi Pronunciation & Accents. München: Lincom Europa, 2016 (co-authored by Ghanshyam Sharma)
Japanese Pronunciation & Accents. München: Lincom Europa, 2016 (co-authored by Francesca Miscio)
Pronuncia giapponese per italiani. Roma: Aracne 2016 (co-authored by Francesca Miscio) 

He has also published a number of workbooks and recordings used in connection with these books.

References
 Warren Shibles, "A Comparative Phonetics of Italian: toward a Standard IPA Transcription", Italica 71:4 (1994), pp. 548–566. .

External links
Official website of canIPA Natural Phonetics

1947 births
Living people
Writers from Venice
Linguists from Italy
Phoneticians